In mathematical analysis, the Hilbert–Schmidt theorem, also known as the eigenfunction expansion theorem, is a fundamental result concerning compact, self-adjoint operators on Hilbert spaces. In the theory of partial differential equations, it is very useful in solving elliptic boundary value problems.

Statement of the theorem

Let (H, ⟨ , ⟩) be a real or complex Hilbert space and let A : H → H be a bounded, compact, self-adjoint operator. Then there is a sequence of non-zero real eigenvalues λi, i = 1, …, N, with N equal to the rank of A, such that |λi| is monotonically non-increasing and, if N = +∞,

Furthermore, if each eigenvalue of A is repeated in the sequence according to its multiplicity, then there exists an orthonormal set φi, i = 1, …, N, of corresponding eigenfunctions, i.e.,

Moreover, the functions φi form an orthonormal basis for the range of A and A can be written as

References

  (Theorem 8.94)

  (Section 16.6)

Operator theory
Theorems in functional analysis